Citheronia phoronea is a moth of the family Saturniidae. It was described from Suriname.

References

Ceratocampinae
Moths described in 1779